Liezel Huber and Magdalena Maleeva were the defending champions, but competed this year with different partners. Huber teamed up with Ai Sugiyama and were eliminated in quarterfinals, while Maleeva teamed up with Katarina Srebotnik and lost in first round.

Nadia Petrova and Meghann Shaughnessy won the title, defeating Svetlana Kuznetsova and Elena Likhovtseva 6–2, 6–3 in the final. It was the 5th doubles title for both players in their respective careers.

Seeds

Draw

Finals

Top half

Bottom half

Qualifying

Qualifying seeds

Qualifiers
  Jennifer Embry /  Mara Santangelo

Qualifying draw

References
 Official results archive (ITF)
 Official results archive (WTA)

2004 NASDAQ-100 Open
NASDAQ-100